Balázs Makány (born May 23, 1987) is a Hungarian swimmer, who specialized in sprint and relay freestyle events. Makany is a member of Kőbánya Swimming Club, and is coached and trained by Gyorgy Turi. He is also a varsity swimmer for the Texas A&M Aggies, and a graduate of computer science at Texas A&M University in College Station, Texas.

Makany made his first Hungarian team, as a 17-year-old, at the 2004 Summer Olympics in Athens, where he competed in the men's 4 × 200 m freestyle relay, along with his teammates Balázs Gercsák, Tamás Szűcs, and four-time Olympian Tamás Kerékjártó. Swimming the third leg, Gercsak recorded a split of 1:52.75, and the Hungarian team went on to finish heat two in last place, for a total time of 7:31.78.

At the 2008 Summer Olympics in Beijing, Makany competed as an individual swimmer in the men's 100 m freestyle. Leading up to his second Games, he cleared the FINA B-standard entry time of 49.79 at the Hungarian National Trials in Budapest to secure a selection on the Olympic team. He challenged seven other swimmers on the fifth heat, including Czech Republic's Martin Verner and Shaune Fraser of the Cayman Islands. Makany raced to a second-place tie with Lithuania's Paulius Viktoravičius, posting a personal best of 49.27 seconds. Makany, however, failed to advance into the semifinals, as he placed twenty-eighth overall in the preliminary heats.

References

External links
Player Bio – Texas A&M Aggie Athletics
NBC Olympics Profile

1987 births
Living people
Hungarian male swimmers
Olympic swimmers of Hungary
Swimmers at the 2004 Summer Olympics
Swimmers at the 2008 Summer Olympics
Hungarian male freestyle swimmers
Texas A&M Aggies men's swimmers
Sportspeople from Pécs
20th-century Hungarian people
21st-century Hungarian people